Zain ud-Din Ahmad Khan, also known as Mirza Muhammad Hashim, was an aristocrat from the Nawab of Bengal family and the father of Siraj ud-Daulah, the last independent Nawab of Bengal.

Early life and background
Mirza Muhammad Hashim was the youngest son of Haji Ahmad, the elder brother of Alivardi Khan. Hashim's paternal grandfather Mirza Muhammad Madani, who was of either Arab or Turkic descent, was the son of a foster-brother of the Mughal emperor Aurangzeb. He had two brothers, Nawazish Muhammad Khan and Sayed Ahmed Khan.

Personal life
Khan married Amina Begum, the daughter of his paternal uncle Alivardi Khan, who would later become the Nawab of Bengal. They had two sons, Ikram ud-Daulah as well as Siraj ud-Daulah, another future Nawab of Bengal. He also had another son and a daughter by the name of Shahzadi Afseen Begum who was married to Diwan Mohanlal of Purnia.

Career
Due to their royal background, Hashim and his family all worked for the administration of his cousin, the Nawab of Bengal Shuja-ud-Din Muhammad Khan. The Nawab granted Hashim the title of Khan. After the ascension of Alivardi Khan as the Nawab of Bengal in November 1740, he was made the Governor of Bihar and given the title of Haibat Jang. He was granted the title of Ihtiram ud-Daulah in 1742.

Khan defended Bihar from Maratha attacks. After Nawab Alivardi Khan and his army general Mustafa Khan killed Bhaskar Pandit, the leader of the Maratha raids, Mustafa expected the governorship of Bihar as his reward. When Mustafa was refused this position, he and his Afghan kinsmen revolted. They attacked Munger and laid siege to Patna. Zain ud-Din Ahmed Khan defended Patna and the rebels were crushed by an army led by Alivardi Khan.

Death and legacy
In 1748, Mustafa Khan launched another invasion in Bihar, this time with the support of Maratha general Raghoji I Bhonsle and Alivardi Khan's defected commander Mir Habib who planned to invade Bengal. Zain ud-Din Ahmed Khan and his army initially repulsed the attack and shot Mustafa Khan dead. However, the rebels later got the upper hand in Patna and assassinated Zain ud-Din Ahmed Khan on 13 January 1748. His two sons and wife Amina Begum were subsequently imprisoned, and his father died of wounds 17 days later.

After pillaging various areas of the Bengal Subah, Mir Habib advanced to Murshidabad, the capital of Bengal and seat of the Nawab. The rebels were finally driven out by Alivardi Khan, who rescued Zain ud-Din Ahmed Khan's wife and two sons. His younger son, Siraj ud-Daulah, succeeded him as the Naib Nazim of Bihar.

References

1748 deaths
Nawabs of Bengal
18th-century Indian Muslims
Indian Shia Muslims